Josh or Joshua Brown may refer to:

Josh Brown (actor) (born 1990), British television actor
Josh Brown (American football) (born 1979), American football kicker
Josh Brown (figure skater) (born 1999), British figure skater
Josh Brown (cricketer) (born 1993), Australian cricket player
Josh Brown (ice hockey) (born 1994), Canadian ice hockey player
Josh Brown (musician) (born 1976), lead vocalist of Christian rock band Day of Fire
Joshua Brown (historian), American social historian
Joshua Brown (Texas pioneer) (1816–1874), first settler of US city of Kerrville, Texas
Joshua Brown (writer), American finance and investment writer
Joshua Brown, a prosecution witness for the murder of Botham Jean who was killed before the trial
Joshua Macave Brown, American convicted murderer of Jesse Dirkhising
J. T. Brown (ice hockey) (Joshua Thomas Brown, born 1990), American ice hockey player